A confluence is the meeting of two or more bodies of water.

Confluence may also refer to:

Science and technology
 Confluence (abstract rewriting), a concept in computer science
 Confluence (meteorology)
 Confluence (software), team collaboration software from Atlassian
 Confluency, a concept in cell culture biology

Places
 Confluence, Kentucky, US
 Confluence, Pennsylvania, US
 La Confluence or simply Confluence, a district of the 2nd arrondissement of Lyon, France
 Confluence (shopping mall)

Other uses
 Confluence (company), an investment management software company
 Confluence (convention), an annual science fiction convention
 Confluence (sculpture),  Indianapolis, Indiana, US
 Confluence: The Journal of Graduate Liberal Studies
 Confluence Project Management, consultancy firm commonly known as Confluence
 Degree Confluence Project, a web-based volunteer project

See also
 Confluent hypergeometric function, a mathematical function
 Convergence (disambiguation)